Fred Murphy may refer to:

 Fred Murphy (cinematographer) (born 1942), American cinematographer
 Fred J. Murphy (1886–1956), American football player, coach of football, basketball, and baseball, and college athletics administrator
 Fred T. Murphy (1872–1948), American football player, physician
 Fred W. Murphy (1877–1937), American football player, coach, official
 Fred Murphy (American football player) (born 1938), former player in the National Football League
 Fred Murphy (wrestler) (1924–1983), Australian Olympic wrestler
 Fred Murphy (ice hockey) (1896–1975), Irish-born Canadian ice hockey player

See also
 Frederick Murphy (disambiguation)